Carole Matthieu is a 2016 French drama film directed by Louis-Julien Petit.

Cast 
 Isabelle Adjani : Carole Matthieu
 Corinne Masiero : Christine Pastres
 Lyes Salem : Alain
 Ola Rapace : Revel
 Pablo Pauly : Cédric
 Arnaud Viard : Jean-Paul
 Sarah Suco : Anne
 Marie-Christine Orry : Sarah
 Sébastien Chassagne : Louis Parrat
 Alexandre Carrière : Vincent Fournier
 Patricia Pekmezian : Anne-Marie
 Christian Joubert : Patrick
 Vincent Duquesne	: Eric

References

External links 
 

2016 films
2016 drama films
2010s French-language films
French drama films
2010s French films